Pristimantis llojsintuta is a species of frog in the family Strabomantidae.
It is endemic to Bolivia.
Its natural habitat is tropical moist montane forests.

References

llojsintuta
Amphibians of Bolivia
Endemic fauna of Bolivia
Amphibians described in 1999
Taxonomy articles created by Polbot